Talara is a city in the Talara Province of the Piura Region, in northwestern Peru. It is a port city on the Pacific Ocean with a population of 91,444 as of 2017. Its climate is hot and dry. Due to its oil reserves, and ability to produce aviation fuel, Talara hosted a United States air base during World War II. It was also one of two refueling stations for the Pacific Fleet. There were naval guns on the hills, and submarine nets in the harbor. The Ajax, Achilles and Exeter, three British destroyers, were refuelled there on their way around the Horn to catch the Graf Spee in Rio de la Plata.  Talara is also home to a large fishing fleet. The city is served by the Cap. FAP Víctor Montes Arias Airport.

Talara is the westernmost city in all of mainland South America. (A small outlying town, Seccion Dieciocho, is situated slightly further west, and just beyond there, the land itself reaches its westernmost extent at Punta Pariñas.)  Talara and some neighbouring cities (Piura and Amotape) served as the backdrop for the short novel Who Killed Palomino Molero? by Mario Vargas Llosa.

Geography

Climate

See also 
2005 Northern Peru earthquake

References

External links

Municipalidad de Talara
Talara

Populated places in the Piura Region
Port cities in Peru
Cities in Peru